The 1997–98 Campionato Sammarinese di Calcio season was the 13th season since its establishment. It was contested by 16 teams, and S.S. Folgore/Falciano won the championship.

Regular season

Group A

Group B

Results
All teams play twice against the teams within their own group and once against the teams from the other group.

Championship playoffs

First round
S.C. Faetano 3-4 S.P. Tre Penne
S.S. Montevito 1-1 (pen 3-4) S.S. Folgore/Falciano

Second round
S.P. Tre Fiori 2-1 S.S. Folgore/Falciano
S.S. Virtus 3-5 S.P. Tre Penne

Third round
S.S. Folgore/Falciano 1-0 S.C. Faetano
S.S. Virtus 5-0 S.S. Montevito

Fourth round
S.P. Tre Fiori 5-0 S.P. Tre Penne
S.S. Folgore/Falciano 3-1 S.S. Virtus

Semifinal
S.S. Folgore/Falciano 3-1 S.P. Tre Penne

Final
S.P. Tre Fiori 1-2 S.S. Folgore/Falciano

References
San Marino - List of final tables (RSSSF)

Campionato Sammarinese di Calcio
San Marino
1997–98 in San Marino football